George Sargeant (born 30 November 1997) is a British actor. He is best known for playing the role of TJ Spraggan in the BBC soap opera EastEnders.

Career
Sargeant made his acting debut during a two part episode of the BBC medical drama Doctors as Ross Milton on 19 and 20 October 2011. 
Then in 2013 featured in a 28 episodes in the BBC soap EastEnders as TJ Spraggan between 7 November 2013 and 12 September 2014. Sargeant reprised the role in 2018 and the character appeared on 18 and 19 January.

Filmography

Television

Film

Stage

Awards and nominations

References

External links
 

1997 births
Living people
21st-century British male actors
British male film actors
British male television actors
Place of birth missing (living people)